Sir Archibald Paull Burt QC (1 September 1810 – 21 November 1879) was a British lawyer, politician and judge. He grew up on the island of Saint Christopher in the West Indies, where both he and his father owned slaves. He studied law in England and returned to Saint Christopher where he served as speaker of the house of assembly, attorney-general and chief justice. In 1861, Burt was appointed as the colony of Western Australia's inaugural chief justice. He held the position until his death in 1879 and was the patriarch of one of the so-called "six hungry families" of the colony.

Early life
Archibald Paull Burt was born in 1810, in Saint Christopher (present day Saint Kitts and Nevis) in the West Indies. He was the son of George Henry Burt, sugar planter and Speaker of the House Assembly of Saint Christopher. He was educated in England where he qualified as a lawyer at the Middle Temple. He returned to his native island in 1835 where he practised as a barrister. Following in his father's footsteps he held the position of Speaker of the House of Assembly of the Islands and in 1848 he was made Attorney General of Saint Christopher and Anguilla and Queen's Counsel. 

In 1835 and 1836 Burt was awarded compensation by the British government for relinquishing slaves in Saint Christopher. The claim on 5 October 1835 for 3 enslaved, yielded £67 0s 3d to Burt himself. Two claims were awarded on 15 February 1836, to Burt and Francis Spencer Wigley (who became President of Saint Christopher in 1880 and of Saint Christopher-Nevis-Anguilla in 1888), for 3 and 4 slaves, netting a total of £119 7s 9d for seven enslaved people.

Western Australia

In 1857, he briefly occupied the position of Chief Justice on his native island but the appointment was not confirmed by the Colonial Office as policy did not favour the appointment of locally born barristers to the judiciary. Sir Archibald began to look elsewhere for judicial office, eventually accepting the post of Civil Commissioner and Chairman of Quarter Sessions in Western Australia. He had hoped that this would be a stepping stone to returning to his native island at a later date.

He arrived in Western Australia with his wife, Louisa Bryan, and five children on 29 January 1861.
In June of that year, the Supreme Court ordinance was proclaimed, thus establishing the Supreme Court of Western Australia. Sir Archibald was appointed Chief Justice and Advocate General.

The initial years of the Supreme Court were characterised mainly by the lack of work. Western Australia was a small colony with few legal issues. Civil work consisted mainly of insolvency and probate, and criminal offences were rare. The size of the profession was so small that only four barristers actively practised in Perth in the early 1860s.

In the early years of the court, Sir Archibald was conspicuous for his support of maintaining the division between barristers and solicitors, and also for his domination of the legal fraternity. He often gave advice to the Governor and Executive Council that was at odds with that of the Attorney General, George Frederick Stone.

As Chief Justice, Sir Archibald gained a reputation for applying the letter of the law. However, considering the conditions of a frontier colony like Western Australia this was necessary and gained Burt widespread respect. He was no stranger to controversy in his time as Chief Justice. In 1869 he jailed three newspaper owners for criticism of his handling of the revocation of an ex-convict's ticket of leave. Despite widespread criticism of this action, Sir Archibald remained implacable in his defence of his duty to protect the integrity of the Court.

As his tenure continued, Sir Archibald gave up any hope of returning to the West Indies, and despite failing health during his last years, remained Chief Justice until his death in November, 1879. He had been a towering figure in Western Australian society and left an indelible mark on the legal profession. Sir Archibald had not courted popularity but he had earned, for himself and the new Supreme Court, widespread respect.

Personal life

The Burt family would continue to be part of Western Australia's legal profession for years to come. Sir Archibald's son, Septimus, would serve as Attorney General and sometime Acting Premier in the early years of responsible government in Western Australia and a century later his great-grandson, Sir Francis Burt would serve as Chief Justice, Lieutenant Governor and Governor.  

The family also continued its influence and presence in Perth society in inter-marriage with other members of the six hungry families. His daughter Louisa Emily Burt was married to George Leake, another barrister who became Premier of Western Australia.

References

Further reading
 (1989) Archibald Burt - detailed biography Brief (Law Society of Western Australia), June 1989, p. 24-27
 Geoffrey Bolton & Geraldine Byrne, May it Please Your Honour: A History of the Supreme Court of Western Australia from 1861-2005, Supreme Court of Western Australia, Perth, 2005
 
 McClemans, Sheila Mary (1966) Archibald Paull Burt, first Chief Justice of Western Australia. Journal and proceedings (Western Australian Historical Society), Vol. VI Pt. V (1966), p. 65-83,

Family papers
 Burt, Archibald Paull, Sir, Papers, 1861-1895 [microform] Battye Library, MN 736, Papers of Sir Archibald Paull Burt, ACC 2829A, 2850A, 2855A Library catalogues description: Business and official letter books (1861-1895), the copy letters written after 4 November 1879 being written by his son and executor Septimus Burt; indexes to Supreme Court Civil Sittings and Court for Divorce and Matrimonial Causes Books 1-11 (incomplete); notebooks of Supreme Court Civil Sittings (1861-1867), of Supreme Court Civil Sittings and Court for Divorce and Matrimonial Causes (1867-1879) and of Supreme Court Criminal Sittings (1861-1879)

1810 births
1879 deaths
Burials at East Perth Cemeteries
Chief Justices of Western Australia
Australian King's Counsel
Colony of Western Australia judges
Judges of the Supreme Court of Western Australia
19th-century Australian judges
British slave owners
Attorneys General of Saint Kitts and Nevis
People from Saint Kitts
Saint Kitts and Nevis judges
19th-century Saint Kitts and Nevis lawyers